Haplomitriopsida is a newly recognized class of liverworts comprising fifteen species in three genera.  Recent cladistic analyses of nuclear, mitochondrial, and plastid gene sequences place this monophyletic group as the basal sister group to all other liverworts.  The group thus provides a unique insight into the early evolution of liverworts in particular and of land plants in general.

Description 
Plants of Treubia grow as a prostrate leafy thallus. The bifid leaves extend like wings on either side of the midrib, or may be folded upwards and pressed close together, giving the plants a ruffled appearance.  By contrast, Haplomitrium grows as a subterranean rhizome with erect leafy stems.  The thin, rounded leaves are arranged around the upright stems, giving the appearance of a soft moss.  The species Haplomitrium ovalifolium of Australia often has bifid leaves that are asymmetrical, somewhat like those in Treubia.

Haplomitrium has a number of unique characters that distinguish it from other liverworts, such as lacking rhizoids. The vegetative stems possess a central water-conducting strand with large perforations derived from plasmodesmata.  This central strand is surrounded by a cylinder of cells that conduct food throughout the plant.  Such an arrangement is evocative of the xylem and phloem found in vascular plants.  Although some thalloid liverwort species in the Pallaviciniaceae also possess a central conducting strand, Haplomitrium differs in having a food-conducting layer and in producing no callose.

Treubia also has features that differ from those found in other bryophytes, such as the differentiation of five identifiable zones in the stem midrib.  Unlike other leafy species, the oil bodies in its cells are restricted to certain clusters of cells, as they are in the Marchantiopsida.  These oil body clusters appear as dark spots in the leaves when the plant is held up to the light.

Diversity 
Living representatives of the group exhibit an essentially Gondwanan distribution with its center of diversity in Australasia.  Such a distribution implies that the modern genera radiated prior to the beginning of the Cretaceous when Gondwana broke apart.  Schuster proposes that species distributed in the northern hemisphere "rafted" on the Indian subcontinent to Asia, then spread across the Bering Strait into North America.

Most species in the Haplomitriopsida are found in south of the equator, though there are northern ones.  The genus Treubia is restricted to the southern hemisphere, while Apotreubia has one species in New Guinea and another disjunct between eastern Asia and British Columbia.  The genus Haplomitrium exhibits a wider distribution, with species in both North and South America, northern and central Europe, the Himalayas, Japan, and Australasia.

Classification 
Class Haplomitriopsida includes two orders, each with one family.  The group as a whole comprises fifteen species in three genera.   A fourth genus, Gessella, is known only from Permian fossils.  The orders, families, and genera are as follows:

 Subclass Haplomitriidae Stotler & Crand.-Stotl.
 Order Calobryales Campbell ex Hamlin 1972 [Haplomitriales Buch ex Schljakov 1972]
 Family Haplomitriaceae Dědeček 1884
†Gessella Poulsen 1974
Haplomitrium Nees 1833 nom. cons. (8 species)
 Subclass Treubiidae Stotler & Crand.-Stotl.
 Order Treubiales Schljakov 1972
 Family Treubiaceae Verdoorn 1932
Apotreubia Hattori & Mizutani 1966 (2 species)
Treubia Goebel 1890 nom. cons. non Pierre 1890 (6 species)

An additional fossil Treubiites kidstonii previously has been compared to the extant genus Treubia.   However, upon re-examination of the material, specimens were determined to be more like Blasia and not at all to resemble Treubia as previously thought.  Accordingly, Treubiites is now assigned to the Blasiales rather than the Haplomitriopsida.

References

External links 

 Liverwort Tree of Life
 Simplified phylogeny of the liverworts 
  Information on family Haplomitriaceae

Liverworts
Plant classes